Howard Gregory (6 April 1893–1954) was an English footballer who played in the Football League for West Bromwich Albion.

References

1893 births
1954 deaths
English footballers
Association football forwards
English Football League players
West Bromwich Albion F.C. players